The Minidish is the tradename used for the small-sized satellite dish used by Freesat and Sky. The term has entered the vocabulary in the UK and Ireland as a generic term for a satellite dish, particularly small ones.

Two sizes exist:
"Zone 1" dishes are issued in southern and Northern  England and parts of Scotland and were 43 cm vertically prior to 2009; newer mark 4 dishes are approximately 50 cm
"Zone 2" dishes are issued in elsewhere (Wales, Northern Ireland, Republic of Ireland, Scotland and northern England), which are 57 cm vertically.

This enforces the use of Sky-approved equipment, but also ensures that a suitable LNB is used. Due to the shape of the dish, an LNB with an oval feedhorn is required to get full signal.

References

Satellite television
Radio electronics
Sky Group
Brands that became generic